Kathrin Koslicki (born 1967) is Professor of Theoretical Philosophy at the University of Neuchâtel, Switzerland. Her primary research areas are metaphysics, ancient Greek philosophy and philosophy of language. Since 2018 Koslicki is visiting professor at the University of Italian Switzerland.

Biography
Koslicki was born and raised in Munich, Germany. She received her BA in philosophy from the State University of New York at Stony Brook in 1990 and her PhD in philosophy from the Massachusetts Institute of Technology in 1995.

Koslicki joined the faculty at the University of Colorado-Boulder in 2007. At the University of Colorado-Boulder, Koslicki sat as Chair of both the Graduate Admissions and Climate Committee, and received the Alvin Plantinga fellowship at the University of Notre Dame. Seven years later, she accepted an appointment as a Tier 1 Canada Research Chair in Epistemology and Metaphysics at the University of Alberta. Since 2019 Koslicki is Visiting Professor at the University of Italian Switzerland.

Koslicki is best known for her defense of a neo-Aristotelian, structure-based theory of parts and wholes.

Bibliography

References

1967 births
Living people
Academic staff of the University of Alberta
MIT School of Humanities, Arts, and Social Sciences alumni
Stony Brook University alumni
German philosophers
Canada Research Chairs
Academic staff of the University of Neuchâtel
University of Colorado Boulder faculty
21st-century German philosophers
German women philosophers